Symphyotrichum patagonicum (formerly Aster patagonicus) is a species of flowering plant in the family Asteraceae endemic to the Argentinian provinces of Chubut, Mendoza, Neuquén, and Santa Cruz. Its flowers have short white ray florets in 3 or 4 series and numerous disk florets.

Citations

References

External links
Symphyotrichum patagonicum on PlanEAr. Spanish with optional English.
Symphyotrichum patagonicum on SIB. Spanish.

patagonicum
Flora of Argentina
Plants described in 1971
Taxa named by Ángel Lulio Cabrera